George Shaya (30 October 1946 – 24 August 2021) was a former association football forward who played for Dynamos and the Rhodesian national team during the 1960s and 1970s. He was considered one of Dynamos' all-time finest players, as well as one of the best ever from present-day Zimbabwe.

Consistently performing well at club level, Shaya was named Rhodesian Soccer Star of the Year a record five times, including the inaugural award in 1969. He was also part of the Rhodesia side which unsuccessfully attempted to qualify for the 1970 FIFA World Cup in 1969.

References

1946 births
Living people
Dynamos F.C. players
Rhodesia international footballers
Rhodesian footballers
Zimbabwean footballers
Association football forwards